Lake Poinsett may refer to:

Lake Poinsett (Arkansas), a lake
Lake Poinsett (Florida), a lake
Lake Poinsett (South Dakota), a lake
Lake Poinsett, South Dakota, a census-designated place

See also
Poinsett (disambiguation)